Jefferson High School is a public high school located in Jefferson, Oregon, United States.

History
The current high school building was completed in 1980.  Before then, the high school was located in what is now Jefferson Middle School.

Academics
In 2008, 89% of the school's seniors received a high school diploma. Of 61 students, 54 graduated, three dropped out, and four were still in high school the following year.

Notable alumni

 Carol Menken-Schaudt (born 1957), 1984 Olympic gold medalist and professional basketball player

References

High schools in Marion County, Oregon
Public high schools in Oregon